Tricolia saxatilis is a species of sea snail, a marine gastropod mollusk in the family Phasianellidae.

Description

Distribution
 KwaZulu-Natal, South Africa

References

Endemic fauna of South Africa
Phasianellidae
Gastropods described in 2006